The Sas van Bosch Baronetcy, of Holland, was a title in the Baronetage of England. It was created on 22 October 1680 for Gelebrand Sas van Bosch, secretary to the Admiralty at Rotterdam. However, nothing further is known of him or any possible descendants.

Sas van Bosch baronets, of Holland (1680)
Sir Gelebrand Sas van Bosch, 1st Baronet (died )

References

Extinct baronetcies in the Baronetage of England